The Erik Kuttner Award, known as the Erik Award, was an annual drama critics' award for professional theatre in Melbourne, Australia.  Established in 1955, the award had categories for actors, actresses, producers (directors) and designers. It operated through to 1981.

The award statuette was designed by Julius Kuhn and was named after Erik Kuttner (died 1954), an actor and producer, commemorating his work in Melbourne theatre. The first ceremony in 1955, featured an appearance by British actress Dame Sybil Thorndike, who presented the best actor and actresses awards.

The Erik Awards were succeeded by the Green Room Awards which started in 1982.

References

Australian theatre awards
Theatre in Melbourne
Awards established in 1955
Awards disestablished in 1982